Belmead (also known as Belmead Plantation, or Belmead-on-the-James) is a historic plantation located near Powhatan, Powhatan County, Virginia, designed by architect Alexander Jackson Davis for Philip St. George Cocke — and constructed about 1845.

It later became the site of two Black Catholic schools, including the only military academy for African-American males.

History

Slavery era and Philip Cocke

Belmead was built by Philip St. George Cocke in 1835. Cocke was the son of John Hartwell Cocke of Bremo Bluff in Fluvanna County, Virginia. He was a graduate of both the University of Virginia and the United States Military Academy and had served for a year in the US Army as a second lieutenant. He resigned in 1834 and consequently devoted his time to working many large plantations in Virginia and Mississippi. One of these plantations was Belmead.

Philip St. George Cocke married Sarah Elizabeth Courtney Bowdoin and had eleven children, the last nine of which were born on Belmead. During Cocke's tenure at Belmead, he owned several slaves who were forced to work on the plantation. According to US Federal Census Records, 82 slaves worked on Belmead in 1840. That number increased to 118 in 1850, and 124 in 1860. These slaves had an assortment of tasks on the tobacco and grain plantation.

In 1861, Cocke was appointed a brigadier general by the Virginia governor. He fought at the First Battle of Bull Run but later that year returned to Belmead. He then shot himself in the head on the day after Christmas.

Black Catholic schools 
In 1897, the property was conveyed to the Sisters of the Blessed Sacrament, headed by Saint Katharine Drexel, and opened as St. Francis de Sales School, an all-Black school for girls, in 1899. St. Emma Military Academy for boys, named after Katharine's stepmother, was opened on the property by Edward Morrell and his wife Louise (Katharine's half-sister). Together, the schools are credited with educating 15,000 Black students.

It was added to the National Register of Historic Places in 1969.

The schools were closed in the early 1970s.

Sale and preservation 
In 2016, the SBS sisters put the 2,265 acres on the market. The sale of the property was managed by Plante Moran Real Estate Investment Advisors, which asked for proposals by Dec. 19, 2016. The community and alumni formed a nonprofit, Belmead on the James, to mount a fundraising campaign.

In June 2019, the property was sold to Jeff Oakley for $6 million. He later allowed alumni to begin hosting tours and making the history of the property more well-known.

Architecture 
The house is a two-story, Gothic Revival style stuccoed brick residence with a three-story central cross gable.  It features a square tower with corner piers, crenellation, belt courses, ground level Tudor arched openings, and diamond-paned casement windows.  The roofline has clusters of circular and polygonal shaped chimney stacks and stepped gable ends.  The kitchen outbuilding was incorporated into an extensive two- and three-story addition built by the school.

References

External links

 Official tour guide page

African-American history of Virginia
Houses on the National Register of Historic Places in Virginia
Gothic Revival architecture in Virginia
Houses completed in 1845
Houses in Powhatan County, Virginia
National Register of Historic Places in Powhatan County, Virginia
African-American Roman Catholicism
African-American Roman Catholic schools
Cocke family of Virginia
Sisters of the Blessed Sacrament